The northern barsided skink (Concinnia brachyosoma)  is a species of skink found in Queensland in Australia.

References

Concinnia
Reptiles described in 1915
Taxa named by Einar Lönnberg
Taxa named by Lars Gabriel Andersson
Taxobox binomials not recognized by IUCN